Knowsley North was a borough constituency represented in the House of Commons of the Parliament of the United Kingdom from 1983 until 1997. It elected one Member of Parliament (MP) by the first past the post voting system.

History
The constituency was a safe seat for the Labour Party throughout its existence. Originally, it was represented by Robert Kilroy-Silk, who resigned in 1986 to pursue a media career. This resignation prompted a by-election, which was won by George Howarth.

Boundaries 
The Metropolitan Borough of Knowsley wards of Cantril Farm, Cherryfield, Kirkby Central, Knowsley Park, Northwood, Park, Prescot East, Prescot West, Tower Hill, and Whitefield.

The constituency covered the northern part of the metropolitan borough of Knowsley, principally the town of Kirkby. Following a review by the Boundary Commission in 1995, the constituency was expanded at the 1997 general election to form the new Knowsley North and Sefton East constituency.

Members of Parliament

Elections

Elections in the 1980s 

 Kilroy-Silk resigned on 1 October 1986, to pursue a media career.

Elections in the 1990s

See also 
 1986 Knowsley North by-election

Notes and references

Sources
 Britain Votes/Europe Votes By-Election Supplement 1983-, compiled and edited by F.W.S. Craig (Parliamentary Research Services 1985)

Parliamentary constituencies in North West England (historic)
Constituencies of the Parliament of the United Kingdom established in 1983
Constituencies of the Parliament of the United Kingdom disestablished in 1997
Politics of the Metropolitan Borough of Knowsley